The Indonesian National Armed Forces (TNI) uses a simplified ranking system for the three branches of Indonesian Army, Indonesian Navy and Indonesian Air Force. Most of the ranks are similar with differences for the rank titles of the high-ranking officers. Exception exists, however, in the ranks of the service members of the Indonesian Marine Corps. While Indonesian Marine Corps is a branch of the Navy, the rank titles of the Marine Corps are the same as those of the Army, but it still uses the Navy's style insignia (for lower-ranking enlisted men, blue replaces the red colour).

As said above, all services maintain the same rank insignia and title, with the main difference for officers are that high-ranking officers use their special titles, while officers below that rank use the similar title but followed by their respective branch/corps abbreviation. For example, an Army colonel with Infantry branch use the title "Kolonel INF.", which "INF" means "Infanteri" or "Infantry"; A Navy colonel with Supply Corps background use the title "Kolonel Laut (S)", in which "S" means "Suplai" or "Supply". Also, an Air Force Colonel with Electronical Engineering Corps background use the title "Kolonel (Lek)", in which "Lek" means "Elektronika" or "Electronics". There are no differences with enlisted personnel's title for Army and Air Force, but the Navy still use the personnel's branch/corps abbreviation behind the title.

High-ranking officers use stars as their insignia, middle-rank officers use jasmine buds and lower-rank officer use bars. High-rank NCOs use wavy bars, NCOs use yellow chevrons, high-rank enlisted men use red chevrons (blue for Navy and Marine Corps) and lower-rank enlisted men use red bars (blue for Navy and Marine Corps).

Rank title

Ranks before 1957 
The following ranks were used at the beginning of the establishment of the Tentara Keamanan Rakyat (TKR, People's Security Armed Forces) in late 1945, the basis of the present day Indonesian National Armed Forces. This first rank system, with insignia following the former Imperial Japanese practice, was used until 1957.

The TKR's Ground, Air and Naval Forces, later the Indonesian Army, Air Force, and Navy, used these ranks. (The same Army ranks were also used by the nascent Indonesian Marine Corps.) 
 Note: Previous spelling used until 1973 was utilised.

Commissioned officer ranks
The rank insignia of commissioned officers.

Other ranks
The rank insignia of non-commissioned officers and enlisted personnel.

Ranks between 1957–73 
The rank system was updated by yet another Government Regulation on 22 June 1957. The Army received the Brigadier General rank, the Navy flag officer ranks were replaced by new ones (Admiral, Vice Admiral, Rear Admiral and Commodore replacing Admiral 1st Class, Admiral 2nd Class and Admiral 3rd Class) and the Air Force flag officer ranks replaced to be similar with Navy (with special title "Udara"). The ranks remained Army-style in the Army and Navy and army-style ranks were formally introduced into the air force. NCOs and Enlisted ranks and ratings became different per service branch. Although the government regulation did not specifically mention rank to be used in the Naval Commando Corps, the rank system of Army was begun to be used in the Naval Commando Corps (Marine Corps today).
 Note: Enhanced Indonesian Spelling System used

Changes between 1973–90 
Government Regulation No. 24/ 1973, updated the rank system once again, the changes were as follows:
 (General Officers, Flag Officers, and Air Officers)
 Ranks of General, Lieutenant General, Major General, Brigadier General are used in the Army, the Naval Commando Corps (Marine Corps today), and the Police.
 Ranks of Admiral, Vice Admiral, and Rear Admiral are to be maintained in the Navy and the rank of Commodore (lit. 'First Admiral') reintroduced
 Air Chief Marshal, Air Marshal, Air Vice Marshal, and Air Commodore are to be used in the Air Force 
 (Field Officers), used same rank system in all branches of armed forces.
 (Subaltern Officers), used same rank system in all branches of armed forces.
 (Warrant Officers), used same Army rank system in all branches of armed forces.
Bintara (NCOs), used same rank system in all branches of armed forces.
Tamtama (Higher Enlisted Rank or Corporal), used Navy and Air Force rank system in all branches of the armed forces.
Tamtama (Lower Enlisted Rank or Privates)
 Private is used in the Army, the Naval Commando Corps (Marine Corps today), and the Air Force (equivalent to Airman)
 Seaman is used in the Navy
 Agent is used in the Police (later restricted to the Mobile Brigade and Water Police, all policemen in the other branches would later start directly as Sergeants)

Changes between 1990–97 

During this period, there are minor changes of rank system in all branch of the armed forces, which are removal of rank of senior warrant officer and new enlisted ranks introduced (Master Corporal and Petty Officer 1st Class and Master Private, Seaman and Senior Airman). Those changes are based on Government Regulation No.6/ 1990.

Changes between 1997–2010 
Government Regulation No. 32/ 1997 regarding the rank system of armed forces was issued. The primary difference with previous regulation are new five-star honorary rank for all branches of the armed forces was introduced and warrant officers rank was re-introduced.

In 2000, with the Indonesian National Police having regained its independence from the armed forces, the TNI rank system ceased to be used.

Current ranks 2010–present  
Five-star honorary rank for all branches of the armed forces are no longer regulated on the latest regulation.

The ranks and rank insignia used today come from the Armed Forces rank regulations of 1990 and 1997, themselves revisions of the first rank regulations published in 1973 to use the current system. All three branches have the same rank titles at the same paygrades, except for the Perwira Tinggi (General Officers, Flag Officers, and Air Officers) and the Tamtama (Lower Rank Enlisted) of the Navy and Air Force.

Rank insignia 

All branches of the armed forces maintain the same rank insignia, with minor color difference in insignia background. Since, all services have at least three type of uniform (Service dress uniform (Pakaian Dinas Harian / PDH), Full dress uniform (Pakaian Dinas Upacara / PDU), and Field uniform (Pakaian Dinas Lapangan / PDL)), there are three different insignia style corresponding to type of uniform. Aside from type of the uniform above, The Navy has uniform for wear in oversea service, officially known as Black Navy. When wearing such uniform, officers wear their ranks as gold  stripes on their lower sleeves. The number and width of the stripes for each rank is similar to that of the United States Navy.

The rank insignia for same services are also differentiated by red piping (command) or no piping (staff) at the sides of the boards.

Note: Indonesia is not a member of NATO, so there is no official equivalence between the Indonesian military ranks and those defined by NATO. The displayed parallel is approximate and for illustration purposes only.

Commissioned officers 
The following are the rank insignia for commissioned officers for the army, navy and air force respectively.

Enlisted 
The rank insignia for enlisted personnel for the army, navy and air force respectively.

See also
Indonesian National Police ranks
Indonesian Maritime Security Agency ranks

References

External links
  military rank at official sites of Tentara Nasional Indonesia
  military rank insignia at official sites of Indonesian Air Force

Military of Indonesia
 
Military ranks